Karl Zuegg (28 February 1914 – 26 December 2005) was an Italian entrepreneur from Lana in South Tyrol. He was the managing director of the Lana fruit juice and jam company Zuegg, between 1940 and 1986.

References

External links
 Zuegg homepage

1914 births
2005 deaths
People from Lana, South Tyrol
20th-century Italian businesspeople